Ventilair– Cycling Team was a Continental cycling team founded in 2005. It was based in Belgium and it participated in UCI Continental Circuits races. The team consisted mostly of young Flemish cyclists.

The team disbanded at the end of the 2013 season.

Major wins 
2005
Overall Tour de Berlin, Dominique Cornu
Stage 3, Dominique Cornu
Stage 4, Steve Schets
Stage 6 Volta a Lleida, Sjef De Wilde
Flèche Ardennaise, Francis De Greef
2006
Stage 2 Tour de Normandie, Jürgen Roelandts
GP Waregem, Jelle Vanendert
Stage 2 Tour du Loir-et-Cher, Jürgen Roelandts
Stage 2 Ronde de l'Isard, Jelle Vanendert
Stage 4 Ronde de l'Isard, Dominique Cornu
Stage 1 Tour de Berlin, Steve Schets
I.W.T. Jong Maar Moedig, Greg Van Avermaet
2007
Stage 4 Tour de Normandie, Kristof De Zutter
Stage 3 Triptyque des Monts et Châteaux, Maarten Neyens
Overall Volta a Lleida, Francis De Greef
Stage 2, Sven Vandousselaere
Stage 3, Francis De Greef
Stage 5a, Team Time Trial
Paris–Tours Espoirs, Jürgen Roelandts
2008
GP de Pérenchies, Steven De Neef
2009
Stage 4 Tour du Loir-et-Cher, Sven Vandousselaere
Stage 1 Tour du Haut Anjou, Sep Vanmarcke
2010
Stage 5 Tour de Normandie, Sven Vandousselaere
GP Stad Geel, Timothy Dupont
2012
Stage 4 Ronde de l'Isard, Niels Vandyck
2013
Stage 2 Tour du Loir-et-Cher, Jeroen Lepla

2013 squad 
As of 17 January 2013.

References

External links 

UCI Continental Teams (Europe)
Cycling teams based in Belgium
Cycling teams established in 2005
Defunct cycling teams based in Belgium
Cycling teams disestablished in 2013